The Tudor Vianu National High School of Computer Science, often referred to as "CNITV" of Bucharest can trace its roots back to 1928 and enjoys nowadays a very good reputation in Romania and even in the world, due to its students who won many international competitions in physics, mathematics, computer science, and chemistry.

History
The history of the Tudor Vianu National College of Computer Science begins with its building situated at 10, Architect Ion Mincu Street in Bucharest. During World War II, the building was the International Red Cross and Red Crescent Movement headquarters. In 1928, the building began to be used as a high school and was first known as the "Academical High School for Girls". Due to the changes that followed after World War II, the institution decided to focus on a prospective domain: computer science. Founded in 1928, the institution received the name of "Theoretical High School for Girls".

Being placed in a high-end residential area, many nomenklatura children attended its classes, especially at the "Dr. Petru Groza", theoretical high school among others.

In September 1970, by the decision of the council of ministers, the "High School of Informatics" was established, also known as Industrial High-School for Systems of Automatic Data processing "SPAD". It started with 4 classes, 109 students, 27 per class, in parallel with the "Peter Groza High School", which continued until the termination in 1974 of the theoretical section under the name of the "High School Informatics Dr. Petru Groza ". 

The computer science classes were completed after September 15, based on the transfer from other high schools in Bucharest, provided that the average admission to that high school is over 9.00. Starting from 1971 the High School organized its own admission exams, where the minimum grade was usually above 9.00, due to high demand as being among the best High schools in the Country. The first promotion from the High School of Informatics graduated in 1975, bringing to the high school the first prizes at the Physics and Mathematics Olympiads by municipality and country (Valeriu Beiu, Andrei Cioara, and Liviu Popa-Simil in Physics; Daniel Mihalcea and Constantin Manoil in Mathematics). The admission rate in higher education was over 90%, qualifying the high school as one of the first high schools in Bucharest at that time. Students' life was good, learning program was intensive but relaxed, students having enough time to do extra-curriculum activities and do good with home-works. Teachers were special, well prepared, nice with students, objective with grading. The purpose of the founding was to produce the mid-level staff specialized in informatics necessary for the development of the Bucharest Computer Factory, which produced the French IRIS-50 license, the CDC-3700 computer, and the implementation of computing techniques in the country. The first generation graduated in 1975, obtaining a Baccalaureate Diploma and a Certificate of Specialist, in Computer Main frame Operation, Programmer and aid analyst, good for hiring in the computing industry.

Period 1970–1975
The 1970 series of the high school included 4 classes of 25 students each, with a program of 4 hours a day in the morning from 8:30 to 12:30. The first 2 years included an intensive specialized program, studying the internal structure of the computer, representation, organization and management of data, algorithms and logic schemes, computers, assembly languages (Asembler; Asiris), programming in Cobol, Fortran and a laboratory of digital electronics and programming of Fc15 Accounting Billing machines, etc. Starting in 1972, elements of general culture and economic and organizational sciences were introduced. 

In the basement, the computer technology laboratory was developed, including terminals, card punches, accounting billing machines, office computers, which was permanently adapted by ICI care.

Academics
The first promotion post-high school specialization range was the following: Economist 30%; Engineers (computer, Electronics, Mechanics) 30%; Engineer-Physicist 1%; Mathematics 6%; Physics 2%; Romanian Army Superior Officer 2%(Economics; Communication-Engineering); Representing 74% of graduates, with higher education, and Athletics Trainer 1%; Technicians in computer related activities 7%, Programmers 16%. This made about one quarter ( 24%) of the students fulfilled the immediate need for qualified personnel in computing activities, as initially desired by the founders, that triggered the founding for more specialization sections in many other high-schools, and continuum education after hours schools.

Period 1975–1980
In 1977, its name was changed again to "High School of Mathematics and Physics No. 1", then, in 1991 "High School of Informatics", so that in 1997 it became "Tudor Vianu National College of Informatics".

Just four years later, the institution changed its name once more and became known as the Mathematics-Physics High School no. 1. The development of microprocessors as Intel 8080 or Zilog Z80 made possible the appearance of micro-computers as M118, HC-85, Tim-S, Cobra etc., operating inside 64 k of memory with external cassette data support or flexible disks, that came to replace the previous multi-head cartridges as ISOT 1370, etc.

Period 1980–1990
At the end of 1989, the Romanian Revolution took place, being a time of changes in computer science too. The era of Zilog Z80 or Intel 8080 was reaching its end, and a new liberalization in the computer market was predictable.

Period 1990–2000
In 1991, just two years after the Romanian Revolution, the school was renamed High School of Computer Science. Since 1997, the institution uses the name of a famous Romanian art critic, poet, philosopher and translator: Tudor Vianu. It is believed Vianu was chosen, even though he excelled in a different domain, due to pressures from the Romanian Communist Party, an executive of whom wanted to honour Vianu. The graduates of Computer Science High School aspire the same level of excellence as Vianu obtained inside National culture. By 1992 the PC286 diagrams were published by IBM and the era of personal/professional computers started.

Period 2000–2020
The evolution of Internet, parallel machines, super-computers challenged new changes in the High-School. In 2007, due to its last admission rating of 9.51, CNITV was ranked first in Bucharest. One year later, its last admission rating suffered a significant drop to 9.17, and was ranked on the 5th place. This drop was believed to have been caused by the Romanian Government's decision to change the entrance examination methodology. In 2009, the high school was ranked 2nd after Saint Sava National College, in 2010 it was ranked 4th, due to its 9.32 last admission rating, and in 2011 was also 4th, with 9.42 last admission rating. And after 9 years, in 2018, the high school was ranked once again the 2nd high school in the country, after Saint Sava National College

International contests
The Tudor Vianu National High School of Computer Science has a long list of excellent students that participated in many International Science Olympiads and other contests. In the last decade only, the students won 30 gold medals, 53 silver medals and 36 bronze medals in different kind of competitions.

Comenius projects
The Tudor Vianu National High School of Computer Science has been participating in two 2 different projects in recent years. The projects were coordinated by Iulia Manicea.

NASA Great Moonbuggy Race
CNITV also took part in other Academic Competitions. In 2009 and 2010, two teams participated in the NASA Great Moonbuggy Race, a competition held in Huntsville, Alabama since 1994. The students had to build a vehicle resembling the Lunar Rover used on the Moon during the last three missions of the American Apollo program and then race it to the finish line.

Romanian Masters of Sciences

The Romanian Master of Mathematics and Sciences  (formerly known as the Romanian Masters in Mathematics), also referred to as RMMS is an annual international competition dedicated to students at preuniversitary level. It is organised by the Tudor Vianu National High School of Computer Science in collaboration with the Sector 1 town council.

The first Romanian Master of Mathematics  took place in 2008. At the 2012 RMMS, there were 14 participating countries: Romania, Russia, Brazil, United Kingdom, United States, Serbia, Bulgaria, Italy, China, Kazakhstan, Republic of Moldova, Ukraine, Poland, and Hungary.  There was no RMMS competition in 2014.

Publications
The official school magazine was Fișierele Tinerilor ("Youth Files"). The articles in the magazine were mainly educational, as they covered subjects as physics, mathematics, chemistry, geography, history and economics. It also enabled pupils to showcase their artistic and literary talents through various contests or activities. Sometimes, it featured articles relating school theatre plays or interviews with pupils that had performed well in various competitions. The journal was produced by an editorial committee of student volunteers, usually with the assistance of some teachers. It was partly financed by commercial advertising and was published every four or five months. The magazine was closed in July 2009.

Principals

Student body structure
5th-8th grade : 2 classes
9th-12th grade : 9 classes

Notable alumni

Nomenclature "Dr. Petru Groza" prior to 1974
 Valentin Ceaușescu – Physicist
 Sergiu Klainerman – Mathematician
 Vintilă Mihăilescu –  Cultural anthropologist
 Petre Roman – Politician and engineer

"Informatics" graduating after 1974
 Mircea Badea – Political analyst
 Tiberiu Georgescu – Chess master, statistician
 Miron Mitrea – Politician and engineer

References

High schools in Bucharest
National Colleges in Romania
1928 establishments in Romania
Educational institutions established in 1928